Larmeck Mukonde (born 1 April 1945) is a Zambian sprinter. He competed in the men's 100 metres at the 1972 Summer Olympics.

References

1945 births
Living people
Athletes (track and field) at the 1972 Summer Olympics
Zambian male sprinters
Olympic athletes of Zambia
Place of birth missing (living people)